Northern Irish cuisine encompasses the cooking styles, traditions and recipes associated with Northern Ireland. It has distinctive attributes of its own, but has also drawn heavily from Irish and British cuisines.

History
Northern Ireland's culinary heritage has its roots in the staple diet of generations of farming families: bread and potatoes.  Historically, limited availability of ingredients and low levels of immigration resulted in restricted variety and relative isolation from wider international culinary influences.

Recent decades, however, have seen significant developments in the local cuisine, characterised by an increase in the variety, quantity and quality of gastropubs and restaurants. There are currently three Michelin-starred restaurants in Northern Ireland, all of which specialise in traditional dishes made using local ingredients.

Northern Irish cuisine received international attention in March 2018 when it was reported that Prince Harry and Meghan Markle had Irish stew and sausage with champ for lunch at the Crown Liquor Saloon during a tour of Belfast.

Dishes and foods

Ardglass potted herring
Ardglass potted herring is found in butcher's shops and fish traders. It is herring that is marinated in vinegar, rolled with bay leaf and baked with breadcrumbs.

Breads

Potato bread
Potato bread is a flat bread prepared with potato, flour, and buttermilk. It is cooked on a griddle.

Soda bread

Soda bread is one of Northern Ireland's griddle breads; it can be eaten straightaway, or cooked until golden in an Ulster fry. They are sometimes eaten with butter and homemade jam, or with savoury food such as smoked salmon, fresh fried eel, or thick dry-cured bacon.

Soda bread is a soft, thick and fluffy bread. It was first baked in the 1800s in Ireland, and local people used baking soda to cause the dough to rise. It is typically served with an Ulster fry.

Wheaten bread

Wheaten bread is a brown bread made with whole wheat flour which also uses baking soda as a rising agent. It is often sweetened in contrast to the savoury white soda bread.

Veda bread

Veda bread is a small, soft, caramel-colored, malted loaf, typically eaten as a slice with a cup of tea. Veda is often toasted and/or served with butter or margarine.

Fifteens
A soft tray bake cake which gets its name from using fifteen of each main ingredient (marshmallows, digestive biscuits, cherries).

Boxty
Boxty, mainly found in County Fermanagh, is a weighty, starchy potato cake made with a 50:50 mix of cooked mashed potatoes and grated, strained, raw potato. The most common variety is boiled boxty, also known as hurley, a large round loaf which is boiled whole for several hours, allowed to rest and then sliced and fried, often with bacon.

Champ
Champ is made with potatoes  mashed with milk and chopped scallions.

Vegetable soup
A vegetable soup made throughout Ulster contains carrots, celery, thin leeks and parsley, thickened with red lentils and barley. Packets of these six ingredients are often sold together as “soup veg”.

Dulse
Dulse is a seaweed snack food. Originally, it was harvested by fishermen for income supplementation when fishing was meager.

Pasties
Pasties are made from a mixture of sausage meat, onions, and mashed potato, shaped like a burger and spiced with black pepper. They can be ordered battered from most chip shops.

Ulster fry

The best known traditional dish in Northern Ireland is the Ulster fry. An Ulster fry, although not originally particularly associated with breakfast time, has in recent decades been marketed as Northern Ireland's version of a cooked breakfast. It is distinguishable from a full breakfast by its griddle breads—soda bread and potato bread, fried (or occasionally grilled) until crisp and golden, and sometimes also includes small pancakes. Bacon, sausages, an egg, and (as a modern development) tomato and sometimes mushrooms complete the dish. It is usually served with tea and toast.

Yellowman
Yellowman is a crunchy golden confectionery and looks a bit like honeycomb. It is mainly sold at fairs and markets.

Beverages
 Bushmills whiskey
 Brown lemonade
 McDaid's Football Special
 Punjana tea
 Nambarrie tea

Notable Northern Ireland chefs
 Jenny Bristow 
 Michael Deane 
 Noel McMeel 
 Robbie Millar 
 Paul Rankin 
 Clare Smyth

See also
 British cuisine
 Irish cuisine

References

British cuisine
Irish cuisine
Cuisine